Aegiale hesperiaris, commonly known as the  tequila giant skipper, is a species of  butterfly in the family Hesperiinae. It is the only species in the monotypic genus Aegiale. Its caterpillar is one of two varieties of edible "maguey worms" that infest maguey and Agave tequilana plants.

The white maguey worm, known as meocuiles, are caterpillars of this species.

It usually is found in regions of central Mexico, on the leaves of family Agavaceae plants, such as: Agave tequilana and Agave americana (maguey). They are not found on cacti, as is often erroneously reported. The butterflies deposit their eggs at the heart of the leaves of agaves. The larvae then eat the flesh of the agave stems and roots, sometimes boring out the agave completely.

References

External links

 Uaemex.mx
 Naba.org: Images of Tequila Giant-Skipper

Erionotini
Edible insects
Insects of Mexico
Taxa named by Francis Walker (entomologist)